Yacine Mousli (born 25 May 1967) is an Algerian athlete. He competed in the men's high jump at the 1992 Summer Olympics.

References

External links
 

1967 births
Living people
Athletes (track and field) at the 1992 Summer Olympics
Algerian male high jumpers
Olympic athletes of Algeria
Place of birth missing (living people)
African Games medalists in athletics (track and field)
African Games bronze medalists for Algeria
Athletes (track and field) at the 1991 All-Africa Games
21st-century Algerian people
20th-century Algerian people